Seedcamp is a European seed-stage venture capital fund, headquartered in London, launched in May 2007 by a group of 30 European investors. The fund's Managing Partners are Reshma Sohoni and Carlos Espinal.

As of August 2017, Seedcamp has a portfolio of over 250 companies who have gone on to raise over $1Bn in follow-on funding from leading investors across the globe.

In November 2017 Seedcamp announced the first close of its fourth fund at £41M - over 20x larger than the investor's first a decade earlier - with the plan to invest in 100 new startups from across Europe.

Seedcamp's notable investments include Wise, Revolut, and UiPath.

History
Seedcamp was originally created by Saul Klein and Reshma Sohoni. Participating VCs and advisors in Seedcamp's launch included Index Ventures, Atomico Investments, Atlas Venture, Balderton Capital, TAG, Forsyth Group and Brown Rudnick. Carlos Espinal joined as Partner in 2010.

In 2014, Seedcamp announced a €20million Seed fund, which enables the early-stage investor in invest up to €200,000 into rounds between €300,000 and €2M. Seedcamp has invested in 24 seed stage startups from its Seed Fund as of September 2015. The fund focuses on providing investment for startups looking to scale globally, rather than focusing on the initial hurdle of getting up-and-running.

In October 2017, Seedcamp announced the acquisition of its first two funds by public listed company, Draper Esprit. Seedcamp will maintain management of all companies, which includes fintech unicorn, Wise, as part of the sale.

In November 2017, Seedcamp announced the first close of a £41M seed fund to invest in 100 new startups across Europe. Seedcamp will lead pre-seed rounds with £100k and can anchor up to £250k by bringing angels and high net-worths into the round. Seedcamp will co-invest in seed rounds of up to £2M where there's already a lead investor on board. Seedcamp Fund IV consists of 60 LPs from across the globe including the likes of Index Ventures, Atomico, Draper Esprit, ADV, Idinvest, Korelya, Speedinvest and big business such as Investec, Thomas Cook Money, Unilever Ventures and MassMutual Ventures, marking the US-based insurer's first investment in Europe.

Seedsummit
Seedcamp spearheaded Seedsummit along with key global partners: a platform aimed at making it easier for startup entrepreneurs to find the most active seed investors relevant to their business. Significantly, Seedcamp was able to sign up 21 European investors to agree on a standard term sheet for startups. Techcrunch presented this as a “historic move”.

Performance and notable exits
In October 2016, Seedcamp revealed it had returned its first fund almost 2x over.

In January 2017, Seedcamp announced a small Secondary sale of its stake in fintech unicorn, Wise described as “one of the best European seed exits in recent years that wasn’t an acquisition or IPO”.

In October 2017, Seedcamp Funds I & II were acquired by Draper Esprit for $26.3 million, delivering a reported 4x return to investors.

Other notable exits include: Mobclix bought by Velti for $50M, RentMineOnline bought by RealPage for $9.5M, Crashpadder acquired by Airbnb, and Talasim acquired by Jeeran.

References

External links 

 

Corporate finance
Venture capital firms of the United Kingdom